David L. "Dave" Barrett (March 22, 1931May 14, 1999) was a businessman and politician in the state of Florida.

He was born in New York and moved to Florida in 1963. He was an alumnus of the Rochester Business Institute, Kettering University, and Rollins College and became a businessman.

He served in the Florida House of Representatives for district 44 from 1974 to 1980 as a member of the Democratic Party.

Personal life and death
Barrett was married to Dorothy H. (née Tuite) Barrett on September 8, 1956, with whom he had six children. He died of progressive supranuclear palsy in Melbourne, Florida on May 14, 1999 at the age of 68.

References

Democratic Party members of the Florida House of Representatives
1931 births
1999 deaths
20th-century American politicians
People from Indialantic, Florida
Neurological disease deaths in Florida
Deaths from progressive supranuclear palsy